The KSU Convocation Center is a multi-purpose arena on the campus of Kennesaw State University in Kennesaw, Georgia, United States. The arena has a listed seating capacity of 4,600 people and opened in 2005. It is home to the Kennesaw State Owls men's basketball, women's basketball, and women's volleyball teams as well as the administrative offices for the KSU athletic department. It is also available for other events and has hosted concerts, conferences, and trade shows, as well as sporting events.

See also
 List of NCAA Division I basketball arenas

References

External links
Kennesaw State University Athletics - Convocation Center

College basketball venues in the United States
Indoor arenas in Georgia (U.S. state)
Kennesaw State Owls
2005 establishments in Georgia (U.S. state)
Sports venues completed in 2005